Ted Cohen may refer to:

Ted Cohen (philosopher) (1939–2014), American philosopher
Ted Cohen (music industry executive) (born 1949), American digital entertainment industry executive
Ted Cohen (Florida politician) (1922–2002), member of the Florida House of Representatives
Teddy Charles (1928–2012, born Theodore Charles Cohen), American jazz musician

See also
Theodore Cohen (disambiguation)
Edward Cohen (1822–1877), Australian merchant and politician